These are regular season standings and playoff results for the NBA G League. The NBA G League is the official minor league basketball organization owned and run by the National Basketball Association (NBA). The league was formed in 2001 as the National Basketball Development League (NBDL). The league was renamed to NBA Development League (NBA D-League) in 2005 to reflect its close affiliation with the NBA. In 2017, it was renamed NBA G League, as part of a sponsorship deal with Gatorade.

2001–02

2002–03

2003–04

2004–05

2005–06

2006–07

Regular season

Eastern Division

Western Division

Notes
x indicates a team that had qualified for the playoffs
Number in parentheses indicates the team's seeding for the playoffs.

Playoffs
Three teams with the best regular season records in each division qualified for playoffs. The playoffs consist of three rounds with single elimination format. Teams with the better regular season record holds home-court advantage in the first and second rounds, while teams with higher seed holds home-court advantage in the Finals. The division winners received a bye from the first round. The remaining teams faced each other in the first round.

Notes
The numbers to the left of each team indicate the team's seeding.
An asterisk (*) denotes overtime period(s).
Teams in bold advanced to the next round.
Teams in italics have home-court advantage in that round.

Finals

2007–08

Regular season

Central Division

Southwest Division

Western Division
Notes
x indicates a team that had qualified for the playoffs
Number in parentheses indicates the team's seeding for the playoffs.

Playoffs
The three division winners, along with the next three teams with the best regular season records regardless of division, qualified for the playoffs. The playoffs consist of three rounds with single elimination format for the first two rounds and best-of-three format for the finals. Teams with the better regular season record holds home-court advantage in every rounds. The three division winners were seeded from 1 to 3 based on their regular season records, while the remaining teams were seeded from 4 to 6 based on their regular season records. The two division winners with the best regular season records received a bye from the first round. The remaining division winners faced the lowest seeded teams, while the two remaining teams faced each other.

Notes
The numbers to the left of each team indicate the team's seeding.
The numbers to the right indicate the number of games the team won in that round.
The division winners are marked by an asterisk (*).
Teams in bold advanced to the next round.
Teams in italics have home-court advantage in that round.

Finals

2008–09

Regular season
Complete rosters for each of the 16 2008–09 NBA D-League teams will consist of the ten players drafted November 7 along with seven returning, allocation, and local tryout players. Rosters will be reduced to 12 players on November 20 and opening-day 10-man rosters must be set by November 26 in anticipation of the November 28 tip off of the NBA D-League's eighth season. Each team will play one preseason game between November 19 and 25.

Central Division

Southwest Division

Western Division
Notes
x indicates a team that had qualified for the playoffs
Number in parentheses indicates the team's seeding for the playoffs.

Playoffs
The three division winners, along with the next five teams with the best regular season records regardless of division, qualified for the playoffs. The playoffs consist of three rounds with single elimination format for the first two rounds and best-of-three format for the finals. Teams with the better regular season record holds home-court advantage in every rounds. The three division winners were seeded from 1 to 3 based on their regular season records, while the remaining teams were seeded from 4 to 8 based on their regular season records. The three division winners had to choose their opponents in the first round from among the four lowest seeded teams. The fourth seeded team would be paired with the remaining team that is not chosen as an opponent by the three division winners. For the first time in the best-of-three era, a team completed a perfect postseason record, with the 14ers going a perfect 4–0 to win the championship.

Notes
The numbers to the left of each team indicate the team's seeding.
The numbers to the right indicate the number of games the team won in that round.
The division winners are marked by an asterisk (*).
Teams in bold advanced to the next round.
Teams in italics have home-court advantage in that round.

Finals

2009–10

Regular season

Eastern Conference

Western Conference

Notes
x indicates a team that had qualified for the playoffs
Number in parentheses indicates the team's seeding for the playoffs.

Playoffs
The Eastern and Western Conference winners, along with the next six teams with the best regular season records regardless of conference, qualified for the playoffs. The playoffs consist of three rounds with best-of-three format. Teams with the better regular season record holds home-court advantage in every rounds. The teams were seeded from 1 to 8 based on their regular season records. The top three seeds had to choose their opponents in the first round from among the four lowest seeded teams. The fourth seeded team would be paired with the remaining team that is not chosen as an opponent by the top three seeds. 

This was the first Finals to feature teams with a single affiliation partnership, which featured the Rio Grande Valley Vipers (operated by the Houston Rockets) and the Tulsa 66ers (operated by the Oklahoma City Thunder). The Vipers won Game 1 and then finished Game 2 with a last-second shot by Craig Winder to win their first championship. 

Notes
The numbers to the left of each team indicate the team's seeding.
The numbers to the right indicate the number of games the team won in that round.
The conference champions are marked by an asterisk (*).
Teams in bold advanced to the next round.
Teams in italics have home-court advantage in that round.

Finals

2010–11

Regular season

Eastern Conference

Western Conference

Notes
x indicates a team that had qualified for the playoffs
Number in parentheses indicates the team's seeding for the playoffs.

Playoffs
The Eastern and Western Conference winners, along with the next six teams with the best regular season records regardless of conference, qualified for the playoffs. The playoffs consist of three rounds with best-of-three format. Teams with the better regular season record holds home-court advantage in every rounds. The teams were seeded from 1 to 8 based on their regular season records. The top three seeds had to choose their opponents in the first round from among the four lowest seeded teams. The fourth seeded team would be paired with the remaining team that is not chosen as an opponent by the top three seeds.

Notes
The numbers to the left of each team indicate the team's seeding.
The numbers to the right indicate the number of games the team won in that round.
The conference champions are marked by an asterisk (*).
Teams in bold advanced to the next round.
Teams in italics have home-court advantage in that round.

Finals

2011–12

Regular season

Eastern Conference

Western Conference

Notes
x indicates teams that have qualified for the playoff

Playoffs
The Eastern and Western Conference winners, along with the next six teams with the best regular season records regardless of conference, qualified for the playoffs. The playoffs consist of three rounds with best-of-three format. Teams with the better regular season record holds home-court advantage in every rounds. The teams were seeded from 1 to 8 based on their regular season records. The top three seeds had to choose their opponents in the first round from among the four lowest seeded teams. The fourth seeded team would be paired with the remaining team that is not chosen as an opponent by the top three seeds.

Notes
The numbers to the left of each team indicate the team's seeding.
The numbers to the right indicate the number of games the team won in that round.
The conference champions are marked by an asterisk (*).
Teams in bold advanced to the next round.
Teams in italics have home-court advantage in that round.

Finals

2012–13

Regular season

Eastern Conference

Central Conference

Western Conference

Notes
x indicates teams that have qualified for the playoff
Maine qualified over Erie due to a better head-to-head record (5-4).

Playoffs
The three conference winners, along with the next five teams with the best regular season records regardless of conference, qualified for the playoffs. The playoffs consist of three rounds with best-of-three format. Teams with the better regular season record holds home-court advantage in every rounds. The teams were seeded from 1 to 8 based on their regular season records. The top three seeds had to choose their opponents in the first round from among the four lowest seeded teams. The fourth seeded team would be paired with the remaining team that is not chosen as an opponent by the top three seeds. For the second time in league history, a team went undefeated in postseason play to win the championship, with the Rio Grande Valley Vipers going 6–0 becoming the second team in league history to win two titles.

Notes
The numbers to the left of each team indicate the team's seeding.
The numbers to the right indicate the number of games the team won in that round.
The conference champions are marked by an asterisk (*).
Teams in bold advanced to the next round.
Teams in italics have home-court advantage in that round.

Finals

2013–14

Regular season

East Division

Central Division

 In addition to finishing tied with each other, Iowa and Sioux Falls also finished tied with Los Angeles. The tie among the three teams was broken with a multiple-team tiebreaker by comparing the teams' records in games against one another. Los Angeles was 3–2 (.600), Iowa was 4–3 (.571), and Sioux Falls was 4–6 (.400). This gave Los Angeles the #2 seed, Iowa the #3 seed and the Central Division championship and left Sioux Falls with the #4 seed.
 Texas and Tulsa split their regular-season series, 3–3. Texas was 8–11 (.421) against opponents with records of .500 or better compared with Tulsa's record of 12–17 (.414) in such games.

West Division

 Idaho won the season series against Bakersfield, 3–2.

Notes
x indicates teams that have qualified for the playoffs with seeding in (parentheses).
 If Los Angeles had not been involved in a three-way tie with Iowa and Sioux Falls, Iowa still would have won the Central Division championship. Iowa and Sioux Falls split their regular-season series, 3-3. Iowa was 13-14 (.481) against opponents with records of .500 or better compared with Sioux Falls's record of 12-13 (.480) in such games. If Sioux Falls had not been involved in a three-way tie with Iowa and Los Angeles, or if the league broke ties within divisions before interdivisional ties, Iowa would have been the #2 seed based on head-to-head record against Los Angeles, since Iowa won the only game the teams played.
 If the league broke ties for non-playoff teams in the same way as it does to determine playoff seeding, the tie among Texas, Tulsa, Idaho and Bakersfield would have been broken using a multiple-team tiebreaker by considering the teams' records in games they played against one another. Tulsa was 5-4 (.556), Bakersfield was 6-5 (.545), Idaho was 5-5 (.500) and Texas was 6-8 (.429) in such games. This would have given Tulsa fourth place in the Central Division, Bakersfield fourth place in the West Division, Idaho last place in the West Division and Texas fifth place in the Central Division.

Playoffs
The three division winners, along with the next five teams with the best regular-season records regardless of division qualified for the playoffs. The playoffs consist of three rounds with a best-of-three format. Teams with the better regular-season record hold home-court advantage in each round but play Game 1 on the road and Games 2 and 3 (if necessary) at home. The teams were seeded from 1 to 8 based on their regular-season records. Division winners were not given any special consideration in the seeding and could be the #8 seed. The three division winners, which may or may not be the three top seeds, had to choose their opponents in the first round from among the four lowest seeded wild-card teams. The top-seeded wild-card team was paired with the remaining team that was not chosen as an opponent by the three division winners. The two division winners which are not the top seed were placed in the lower half of the bracket which meant they would meet in the semifinals should they both advance. This would also result in the top two seeds meeting in the semifinals if they were from the same division and both advanced. For the third time, a team went 6–0 in postseason play, which saw the Fort Wayne Mad Ants become champions for the first time ever, while the Santa Cruz Warriors became the first D League team to ever lose back-to-back Finals (a feat not matched as of 2022).

Notes
The numbers to the left of each team indicate the team's seeding.
The numbers to the right indicate the number of games the team won in that round.
The division champions are marked by an asterisk (*).
Teams in bold advanced to the next round.
Teams in italics have home-court advantage in that round.

Quarterfinals

Semifinals

Finals

2014–15

Regular season

Eastern Conference

Western Conference

2015–16

Regular season

Eastern Conference

Western Conference

2016–17

2017–18

2018-19

2019-20

2020-21

2021-22

References

General

External links
Official site
D-League at Basketball-Reference.com

Standings